Dekinda is a village in Sri Lanka. It is located within Central Province. This could be regarded as a village blessed with scenic beauty because there are beautiful waterfalls near the village, one of them being Galboda Ella.

See also
List of towns in Central Province, Sri Lanka

External links

Populated places in Kandy District